The 81st Scripps National Spelling Bee finals took place on May 30, 2008.

Competition
Two hundred eighty-eight champion spellers competed in the 2008 Scripps National Spelling Bee in Washington, D.C., a new record. Most of the spellers were from the United States, with a small showing from other locations such as Ghana, Jamaica, New Zealand, and South Korea. Twenty-two were Canadian. Wikipedian Emily Temple-Wood was one of the competitors. Sriram Hathwar, who would be a co-winner of the 2014 bee six years later, set a new record as the youngest ever participant to date, only a month past his 8th birthday.

Champion
The winner was Sameer Mishra, a 13-year-old eighth grader at West Lafayette Junior-Senior High School, in Indiana. He was sponsored by his hometown newspaper, the Journal & Courier. His winning word was guerdon. He won $35,000 in cash and more than $5,000 in prizes.

In rounds 3 through 15, Mishra spelled "demitasse", "quadrat", "diener", "hyssop", "macédoine", "basenji", "numnah", "chorion", "nacarat", "sinicize", "hyphaeresis", "taleggio" and "esclandre" correctly, in that order. In second place came Sidharth Chand, 13, misspelling "prosopopoeia" as "". In third place came 13-year-old Tia Thomas, misspelling "opificer" as "".

In a comical moment during the spelling bee, he mistook the word "numnah" for "numb nut".

Mishra incorrectly spelled "sudation" in Round 2 as "sudatian". However, because a speller's combined score from Rounds 1 and 2 determines whether he or she advances in the competition, a speller can incorrectly spell a word in Round 2 without being eliminated.

TV coverage
As with previous years, coverage was divided amongst American Broadcasting Company properties, the quarter-finals were broadcast on ESPN360, and the semi-finals were aired by ESPN, and the finals were broadcast by ABC. Unlike other ESPN-produced telecasts for ABC, ESPN branding was not used, even though the telecasts adopted the newer-styled ESPN graphics package.

Word list championship round

 guerdon
 prosopopoeia
 esclandre
 introuvable
 taleggio
 Kulturkampf
 hyphaeresis
 opificer
 aptyalism
 sinicize
 oxylophytic
 tamale
 posaune
 ecrase
 nacarat
 shtetl
 rhyton
 Huapango
 parfleche
 lemel
 bogatyr
 ziarat
 martellato
 chorion
 fumagillin
 satyagraha
 escabeche
 Nietzschean
 ranunculaceous
 boulangère
 ommateal

See also
 List of Scripps National Spelling Bee champions

References

Scripps National Spelling Bee competitions
2008 in American television
2000s American television specials
Scripps National Spelling Bee
2008 in education
May 2008 events in the United States